Pierre Gillet (25 February 1930 – 11 August 2008) was a French middle-distance runner. He competed in the men's 1500 metres at the 1952 Summer Olympics.

References

1930 births
2008 deaths
Athletes (track and field) at the 1952 Summer Olympics
French male middle-distance runners
Olympic athletes of France
Place of birth missing
20th-century French people